is a Japanese professional golfer.

Inamori played on the Japan Challenge Tour from 2012 to 2014, winning the 2014 Seven Dreamers Challenge. He has played on the Japan Golf Tour since 2014, winning the 2018 and 2020 Japan Opens.

Professional wins (5)

Japan Golf Tour wins (4)

 The Japan Open Golf Championship is also a Japan major championship.

Japan Challenge Tour wins (1)

Results in major championships
Results not in chronological order in 2020.

"T" indicates a tie for a place
NT = No tournament due to COVID-19 pandemic

Results in World Golf Championships

1Cancelled due to COVID-19 pandemic

NT = No tournament
"T" = Tied

References

External links

Japanese male golfers
Japan Golf Tour golfers
LIV Golf players
Sportspeople from Kagoshima Prefecture
1994 births
Living people